Arnhold may refer to:

Arnhold (surname), a surname
Arnhold Holdings Ltd., a Hong Kong company
Arnhold Rivas (born 1989), Mexican footballer

See also
Arnold (disambiguation)